This is a list of the kings of the Ondonga people, a Namibian subtribe of the Owambo. The kingdom was founded in 1650. Since then there have been 18 kings. The kings reside at a Royal Homestead in a village of their choice with Onamungundo having been a royal seat for more than 2 kings.

References 

History of Namibia
Ovambo people
Ondonga